The France women's national handball team is the national team of France. It is governed by the Fédération Française de Handball and takes part in international handball competitions.

Results

Olympic Games

 2000 – 6th.
 2004 – 4th
 2008 – 5th
 2012 – 5th
 2016 –  Silver medal
 2020 –  Gold medal
 2024 – Qualified

World Championship
 1986 – 15th
 1990 – 14th
 1997 – 10th
 1999 –  2nd
 2001 – 5th
 2003 –  Winner
 2005 – 12th
 2007 – 5th
 2009 –  2nd
 2011 –  2nd
 2013 – 6th
 2015 – 7th
 2017 –  Winner
 2019 – 13th
 2021 –  2nd
 2023 – Qualified

European Championship
 2000 – 5th
 2002 –  3rd
 2004 – 11th
 2006 –  3rd
 2008 – 14th
 2010 – 5th
 2012 – 9th
 2014 – 5th
 2016 –  3rd
 2018 –  Winner
 2020 –  2nd
 2022 – 4th

Other tournaments
 1987 Mediterranean Games – 2nd
 1989 Carpathian Trophy – 3rd
 1991 Mediterranean Games – 2nd
 1993 Mediterranean Games – 2nd
 1997 Mediterranean Games – Winner
 2001 Mediterranean Games – Winner
 2005 Mediterranean Games – 4th
 2009 Mediterranean Games – Winner
 2002 Møbelringen Cup – 3rd
 2004 Møbelringen Cup – 2nd
 2006 Møbelringen Cup – 3rd
 2012 Møbelringen Cup – Winner
 2014 Møbelringen Cup – 3rd
 2016 Møbelringen Cup – 4th
 2018 Møbelringen Cup – 2nd
 GF World Cup '07 – 2nd
 GF World Cup '08 – 3rd
 GF World Cup '10 – 3rd
 GF World Cup '11 – 3rd
 2014–15 Golden League – 2nd

Team

Current squad
Squad for the 2022 European Women's Handball Championship.

Head coach: Olivier Krumbholz

Coaching staff

Notable players
Several French players have seen their individual performance recognized at international tournaments.
MVP
Valérie Nicolas (goalkeeper), 2003 World Championship
Estelle Nze Minko (left back), 2020 European Championship
All-Star Team
Nodjialem Myaro (centre back), 1999 World Championship
Stéphanie Cano (right wing), 2002 European Championship
Valérie Nicolas (goalkeeper), 2003 World Championship, 2007 World Championship
Isabelle Wendling (line player), 2003 World Championship
Véronique Pecqueux-Rolland (centre back), 2004 Summer Olympics
Mariama Signaté (left back), 2009 World Championship
Allison Pineau (centre back), 2009 World Championship, 2011 World Championship, 2016 Summer Olympics
Alexandra Lacrabere (right back), 2016 Summer Olympics
Béatrice Edwige (defender), 2016 European Championship
Grâce Zaadi (centre back), 2017 World Championship, 2020 Summer Olympics, 2021 World Championship
Siraba Dembélé (left wing), 2017 World Championship
Amandine Leynaud (goalkeeper), 2018 European Championship
Laura Flippes (right wing), 2020 Summer Olympics
Pauletta Foppa (line player), 2020 Summer Olympics, 2021 World Championship, 2022 European Championship
Coralie Lassource (left wing), 2021 World Championship
Cléopatre Darleux (goalkeeper), 2022 European Championship

Individual all-time records

Most matches played
Total number of matches played in official competitions only.

Head coach history

References

External links

IHF profile

National team
France
Women's national sports teams of France